King Jie (traditionally 1728–1675 BC) was the 17th and last ruler of the Xia dynasty of China. He is traditionally regarded as a tyrant and oppressor who brought about the collapse of a dynasty.

Around 1600 BC, Jie was defeated by Tang of Shang, bringing an end to the Xia Dynasty that lasted about 500 years, and a rise to the new Shang Dynasty.

Etymology
Jié  (ZS) means "outstanding" and later "hero"; insides Chinese, it is cognate to qiè  (< OC ) (ZS) "martial"; outsides Chinese it is cognate to either  "strength; champion, athlete", or Mizo:  "brave, resolute".

The rime dictionary Guangyun later associates this Xia king's name (or epithet) Jié  with  zhé "to dismember, to cut asunder". Kangxi dictionary states that 磔 (zhé) is synonymous with  pìgū "to cut asunder and open up", in Rites of Zhou; and that "the ancients asserted that the fierce and devious ( jiéxiá) ones are brutal and violent ( xiōngbào), as if they were cutting [things] asunder ( zhé)."

Historian Pei Yin (|裴骃) cites Rules for Posthumous Names ( Shìfǎ) (attributed to the Duke of Zhou), that Jié  was meant for those who harmed and killed numerous people.

Early years
Jie is generally known as Xia Jie (夏桀) or Jie of Xia. His given name was Lü Gui (履癸). Jie ascended to the throne in the year of Renchen (壬辰). Initially, his capital was in Zhenxun. He lived there for three years and constructed his tilt palace. About the same time, he destroyed the pyramid of Rong (容台), and quelled a rebellion by the Quanyi people (aka Fei Barbarians) after they entered Qi, near Fen.

His parents were Fa of Xia and his wife.

King of Xia

Ruling
Jie is known to have lived a lavish lifestyle with slaves and treated his people with extreme cruelty. His style of ruling was reckless and filled with sex, luxury and entertainment. He generally disliked people who criticized him, and many were indeed afraid of him.

In the sixth year of Jie's regime, he entertained envoys from vassals and neighbors. He received an envoy from the Qizhong barbarian people (歧踵戎). In the 11th year, he summoned all his vassals to his court. The Youmin Kingdom (有緡) did not come, so Jie attacked and conquered it.

In his 13th year of the ruling, he moved his capital from Zhenxun to 'South of the He' (河南). About that time, he began using the Nian (輦), or sedan chair, on which he was carried by servants.

The next year, he led an army to Minshan. There, he found two of the King of Minshan's daughters, Wan(琬) and Yan(琰). They were unmarried and very beautiful, so he took them as his wives, renaming them Zhao (苕) and Hua(華) . He abandoned his original wife Mo Xi (妹喜) and built a pyramid on top of the Tilt Palace for them to live in.

Alcohol lake

According to Liu Xiang's book Lienü zhuan written much later, around 18 BC, Jie was corrupted by his infatuation with his concubine Mo Xi (妺喜 or 末喜), who was beautiful, but completely lacking in virtue. Among other things, she liked to drink, enjoyed music, and also had a penchant for jugglers and sing-song girls. Apparently, she had Jie order a lake of wine made. They both sailed about in the alcohol lake in an orgy of drunken naked men and women bathing and drinking. She then commanded 3,000 men to drink the lake dry, only to laugh when they all drowned. This event was also recorded in Han Ying's book Han shi waizhuan.

Jie's cuisine
A great deal of effort was spent on Jie's cuisine and his requirements. Vegetables had to come from the northwest, fish had to be from the East Sea, seasonings and sauces had to come from ginger that grew in the south, sea salt had to come from the north. Several hundred people were employed just to supply Jie with his meals. Anyone that got his meal wrong was beheaded.

Jie was also a known alcoholic, but he did not drink regular wine. He drank a type of pure alcohol wine (清醇). The people working for him who could not supply this drink were killed. Many people died because of this. And while he was drinking wine it was required that he ride on someone's back like a horse.

In one incident Jie was riding the back of a top chancellor like a horse. After a while the chancellor was tired to the point that he could no longer crawl or move. He asked Emperor Jie to spare him. Jie immediately dragged him out to be executed. Another chancellor, Guan Longfeng (關龍逢), told the emperor that he was losing the trust of his people along with the Xia dynasty's rivers and mountains (江山). After yelling at Guan, he too was dragged out to be killed.

Collapse of the Xia Dynasty

The rise of Shang 
The Xia Dynasty held suzerainty over a number of kingdoms, one of which was the Kingdom of Shang. During Jie's reign, Shang grew in power, initially at the expense of Xia's other vassals. A person by the name of Zi Lü was able to win many supporters from as many as 40 smaller kingdoms. Tang of Shang recognized that Jie mistreated the people and used this as a way to convince other supporters. In one speech Tang of Shang said that creating chaos is not something he wanted, but given the terror of Jie, he has to follow the Mandate of Heaven and use this opportunity to overthrow Xia. He also pointed out that even Jie's own military generals would not obey his orders.

In the 15th year of Jie's reign, Tang of Shang began moving Lü (履) to the capital Bo. About two years later Shang sent his minister Yi Yin as an envoy to Jie. Yi remained in the Xia capital for about three years, before returning to Shang.

The Shang's power continued to grow. In the 26th year of Jie's reign, Shang conquered Wen. Two years later, Shang was attacked by Kunwu (昆吾), and several years of war between Shang and Kunwu followed. Despite this setback, Shang continued to expand on a number of fronts, gathering vassal troops in Jingbo (景亳). The Shang army and allied forces conquered Mixu (密須) (today's 密縣), Wei, and attacked Gu (顧), which was also conquered the following year. Around the same time Zhong Gu, chief historian of Jie, fled from the Xia to the Shang.

Natural disasters
As Jie's reign went on, the histories record unusual and increasingly dire natural phenomena. These began in the 10th year of Jie's reign, when five stars were seen in the sky in alignment and a meteor shower occurred, followed by an earthquake.

In the 29th year of Jie's reign he tried to dig a water-tunnel through the Qu mountain, but the next year the mountain collapsed with a landslide. There was also a disaster at Linsui (聆隧) in the winter.

Records from the later Qin Dynasty say that during the last year of Jie's reign, ice formed during the summer mornings and frost occurred through July. Heavy rainfall toppled buildings, hot and cold weather arrived in disorder, and crops failed. Some scientists correlate this event with a volcanic winter, possibly due to the Minoan eruption of Thera at around 1600 BC.

Battle of Mingtiao

In the 32nd year of Jie's reign, Tang of Shang dispatched troops from Er (陑) to simultaneously attack Xia and Kunwu. Kunwu was quickly defeated. By this time, the Xia were getting weaker near the Yellow River while the Shang were becoming stronger.

Jie's forces fought with the Shang forces at Mingtiao in a heavy thunder storm and were defeated.

Jie himself escaped and fled to Sanzong. The Shang forces, under their general Wuzi (戊子), pursued Jie to Cheng, captured him at Jiaomen and deposed him, bringing the Xia dynasty to an end. Eventually, Jie was released in Nanchao. Jie eventually died of illness. Tang of Shang succeeded as king by Tang, who inaugurated the Shang Dynasty.

Family 
King Jie had a wife named Mo Xi (妹喜) who was blamed for the fall of the Xia Dynasty, but he later abandoned her for the King of Minshan's daughters Wan and Yan whom Jie renamed Zhao and Hua. King Jie had no known children with his wives. It is alleged that Chunwei, the possible ancestor of the Xiongnu ruling elite, was his son.

See also
 Mount Tai earthquake

References 

Xia dynasty kings